Toomas Tõniste (born 26 April 1967) is an Estonian sailor and politician, and the former Minister of Finance.

Career in sports
Tõniste competed in four consecutive Summer Olympics, starting in 1988. He won a silver and a bronze medal in the men's 470 class, for the Soviet Union (silver, 1988) and for Estonia (bronze, 1992). He did so with his twin brother Tõnu Tõniste.

Education
Tõniste graduated from Tallinn University.

Career in politics
Between 2007 and 2015, Tõniste was a member of the 11th and 12th Riigikogu (Parliament of Estonia), serving as Chairman of the Committee  on Economic Affairs.

On 7 June 2017, Tõniste replaced Sven Sester as Minister of Finance of Estonia.

Other activities

European Union organizations
 European Investment Bank (EIB), Ex-Officio Member of the Board of Governors
 European Stability Mechanism (ESM), Member of the Board of Governors

International organizations
 European Bank for Reconstruction and Development (EBRD), Ex-Officio Member of the Board of Governors
 Nordic Investment Bank (NIB), Ex-Officio Member of the Board of Governors
 Multilateral Investment Guarantee Agency (MIGA), World Bank Group, Ex-Officio Member of the Board of Governors
 World Bank, Ex-Officio Member of the Board of Governors

Corporate boards
 State Forest Management Centre, Member of the Supervisory Board (2008-2011)

References

External links
 
 
 

1967 births
21st-century Estonian politicians
Estonian male sailors (sport)
Estonian sportsperson-politicians
Finance ministers of Estonia
Government ministers of Estonia
Living people
Medalists at the 1988 Summer Olympics
Medalists at the 1992 Summer Olympics
Members of the Riigikogu, 2007–2011
Members of the Riigikogu, 2011–2015
Olympic bronze medalists for Estonia
Olympic medalists in sailing
Olympic sailors of Estonia
Olympic sailors of the Soviet Union
Olympic silver medalists for the Soviet Union
Sailors at the 1988 Summer Olympics – 470
Sailors at the 1992 Summer Olympics – 470
Sailors at the 1996 Summer Olympics – 470
Sailors at the 2000 Summer Olympics – 470
Soviet male sailors (sport)
Sportspeople from Tallinn
Estonian twins
Twin sportspeople